Rogoziniec  is a village in the administrative district of Gmina Zbąszynek, within Świebodzin County, Lubusz Voivodeship, in western Poland.

The village has a population of 660.

There is Autostrada A2 MOP(Miejsce Obsługi Podróżnych) called Rogoziniec which lies on the route of A2. MOP stands for rest place on the highway, which include parking, sometimes(like in this case) restaurant, petrol station, toilet etc.

References

Villages in Świebodzin County